

Events

January
 – Planned completion of Los Angeles Metro Rail Gold Line Foothill Extension to Pomona, California.

February
 – Estimated start of South Shore Line service along the West Lake Corridor in Northwest Indiana.

April

Unknown date
 – Metro Tunnel is planned to open, connecting north and south railway lines in Melbourne.
 – Vienna U-Bahn line U5 opening.
 – Possible completion of Hasselt – Maastricht tramway.
 – O-Train Confederation Line (Ottawa) Stage 2 West extension earliest completion date.
 – Valley Line (Edmonton) extension earliest completion date.
 – Skytrain (Vancouver) Extension of the Millennium Line to Arbutus street from VCC-Clark
 – Shenzhen Metro is claimed to exceed 1000 km length.
 – Shanghai Metro is claimed to exceed 1000 km length.
 – Greater Copenhagen Light Rail opening.
 – Paris Métro Line 13 automation start (end in 2027).
 – Expected completion of Stuttgart 21 railway.
 – Delhi Metro network to exceed 450 km.
 – Tehran Metro network to exceed 430 km.
 – claimed opening of high-speed Drammen–Tønsberg line and Dovre Line sections.
 – Makati Intra-city Subway opening.
  – The first phase of the North–South Commuter Railway is scheduled to partially open.
 – Circle MRT line final extension to make closed full loop.
 – Several short high-speed lines upgrading to 250 km/h.
 – Wanda–Zhonghe–Shulin line opening.
 – Northern HSR Phase 1 opening.
 – Northeastern HSR Phase 2 opening.
 – West Midlands Metro Eastside extension is planned to be put into operation, providing connections to Birmingham Airport and High Speed 2.
 – Los Angeles Purple Line Extension Phase 2 expected to be complete.
 – Planned completion of the complete Honolulu Rail Transit to Ala Moana, though delays are possible.
 – Estimated restoration of rail service along the Lackawanna Cut-Off, with New Jersey Transit starting commuter service to Andover Township.
 – Altamont Corridor Express services are expected to be extended to Merced.
 – Earliest expected opening of the Norristown High Speed Line King of Prussia Spur.
 – The Federal Way Extension of Link light rail is scheduled to open between SeaTac and Federal Way, Washington.
 – The Downtown Redmond extension of Link light rail's Line 2 is scheduled to open.

References